, a historical Japanese occupation equivalent to "fletcher", may refer to:

 Yahagi, a former village now part of Rikuzentakata, Iwate, Japan
 Yahagi Domain, Shimōsa Province, now in Chiba Prefecture, Japan
 , several ships
 Rikuzen-Yahagi Station, Rikuzentakata, Iwate Prefecture, Japan
 Yahagi River, with its source in Nagano Prefecture, Japan
 4941 Yahagi, an asteroid
 Yahagi (apple), a variety of apple

People with the surname
 Honoka Yahagi (born 1997), Japanese actress, fashion model, and voice actress
 Kôsuke Yahagi, Japanese manga magazine editor; editor-in-chief of Jump Square
 Sayuri Yahagi (born 1986), Japanese voice actress
 Toshihiko Yahagi, Japanese novelist; winner of the 2004 Mishima Yukio Prize

Fictional characters with the surname
 Shogo Yahagi, in Megazone 23 
 Yoshimi Yahagi, in the novel Battle Royale

See also
 Yahaghi (disambiguation)
 Kamiyahagi, Gifu, a former town, now part of the city of Ena, Japan
 Battle of Yahagi-gawa, 1181